Integral is a concept in calculus.

Integral may also refer to:

in mathematics
 Integer, a number
 Integral symbol
 Integral (measure theory), or Lebesgue integration
 Integral element

in computer science
 Integral data type, a data type that represents some range of mathematical integers

in philosophy and spirituality
Integral humanism (India), political philosophy in Hindu nationalism
Integral theory, an area of discourse emanating from Ken Wilber's thought on spiritual evolution, methodology and ontology.  Also known under other names, including integral philosophy, integral worldview, etc.
 Integral Culture, transmodern subculture referred to by sociologist Paul H. Ray

as a proper name
 INTEGRAL, the International Gamma-Ray Astrophysics Laboratory
 Intégral: The Journal of Applied Musical Thought, a music-theory journal 
 "Integral (song)", a Pet Shop Boys song from Fundamental
 The Integral, a glass spaceship in Yevgeny Zamyatin's novel We
 Integral (horse), a British Thoroughbred racehorse
 Integral, an extended play by The Sixth Lie
 Integral (album)
 Integral (train), diesel multiple unit train type

See also

 Integralism,  ideology according to which a nation is an organic unity
 Integrality, in commutative algebra, the notions of an element integral over a ring
 Integration (disambiguation)